{{Infobox album|
|
| name       = Cheap As Art
| type       = Album
| artist     = Matisse
| cover      = B_matissecheap.jpg
| alt        =
| released   = 21 June 2005
| recorded   = June 2005
| venue      =
| studio     =
| genre      = Alternative rockIndie rockPop rock
| length     =
| label      = Sony BMG Greece/Columbia
| producer   = Aris Christou
  Last album = 4(2003)
| prev_title =
| prev_year  =
| next_title = Toys Up
| next_year  = 2007
}}Cheap As Art is the debut album by the Greek alternative rock band Matisse. They depict their debut as "an invocation to lunacy, as art always bowed down to madness"''.

Track listing 
"Let Me Go Home"
"Rock N' Roll For Boys"
"The Gospel"
"She Smiles"
"Fragments Of Life"
"The Only One I Love Is My Hate"
"Cosmic Dancer" (T.Rex Cover)
"Bedroom Eyes"
"Jealous"
"Innocent Lie"
"Song About A Song"
"Cheap As Art"
"She Smiles (Cyanna Remix)"
"Let Me Go Home (Marsheaux Remix)"
"Pluto"

References

Matisse (band) albums
Sony Music Greece albums
2005 albums